Comando Revolucionario Social Cristiano ('Christian Social Revolutionary Command') was an underground political movement in Honduras. The organization was founded on December 22, 1967, by a group of 17 lay Catholics. The group was active in the peasants movement. On September 10, 1968 the group founded the Christian Democratic Movement of Honduras.

References

Defunct political parties in Honduras
Political parties established in 1967